The Sussex Newspaper is an online community project that covers all of Sussex county in the UK. Unlike most newspapers in the region, TSN, as it is known, has a clear policy of giving preference to positive stories.  It also treats the county as a whole as its readership, avoiding giving preference to any one town or city.   Articles include news, features, reviews, tips and advice and profiles of people, businesses and places in Sussex.  The newspaper attracts an average of 14,000 unique visitors a week and is considered the fastest growing online newspaper in Sussex.  The Sussex Newspaper has an online radio station called TSN Radio.  This is produced by the newspaper contributors and features regular shows about Sussex.

Newspapers published in Sussex